Fair Hill Burial Ground is a historic cemetery in the Fairhill neighborhood of Philadelphia, Pennsylvania. Founded by the Religious Society of Friends in 1703, it fell into disuse until the 1840s when it was revived by the Hicksite Quaker community of Philadelphia, which played an important role in the abolition and early women's rights movements.  The cemetery is currently operated by the Fair Hill Burial Corporation, which is owned by Quakers and neighborhood community members.

History

William Penn gave 1250 acres in Pennsylvania to George Fox in 1681. Fox dedicated six acres in 1686 for a meeting house and burial ground near the current site of the burial ground. Burials began about 1707, but the site did not develop into an active burial ground. The Green Street Monthly Meeting took control of the site in 1818.

Following the Orthodox-Hicksite split, the three Hicksite meetings in Philadelphia in 1840 – Philadelphia Meeting, Spruce Street Meeting, Green Street Meeting – agreed to use the land for a burial ground. Starting in 1843, a Joint Committee on Interments oversaw the burial ground.  The Fair Hill Meeting House was built nearby, on Cambria Street in the 1880s.

Both the meetinghouse and the burial ground were sold to Ephesians Baptist Church in 1985, but in 1993 the burial ground was purchased by the Philadelphia Quarterly Meeting, which continues to own and maintain it.

Notable interments
Rudolph Blankenburg, reformist mayor of Philadelphia
Lucretia Longshore Blankenburg, American second-generation suffragist, social activist, civic reformer, writer, and first lady of Philadelphia
William Morris Davis, US Congressman
Mary J. Scarlett Dixon (1822-1900), physician
Anna Jeanes, Quaker philanthropist
Mary Ann M'Clintock
Thomas M'Clintock
Lucretia Mott, abolitionist, women's rights activist, and social reformer
Edward Parrish, pharmacist and the first president of Swarthmore College
Ann Preston, first woman dean of a US medical school
Harriet Forten Purvis
Robert Purvis
Deborah Fisher Wharton

References

External links

Fair Hill Burial Ground at Find A Grave

Cemeteries in Philadelphia
Cemeteries on the National Register of Historic Places in Philadelphia
Quakerism in Pennsylvania
1703 establishments in Pennsylvania
History of Philadelphia
Lower North Philadelphia